Mildbraediodendron excelsum is a species of flowering plant in the family Fabaceae, and the only species in the genus Mildbraediodendron. It belongs to the subfamily Faboideae. The genus was named in honor of the German botanist Johannes Mildbraed.

References

Amburaneae
Monotypic Fabaceae genera